Semagystia pushtunica is a moth in the family Cossidae. It was described by Yakovlev in 2007. It is found in northern Afghanistan.

The length of the forewings is about 14 mm. The forewings are light grey with a narrow dark
Border, a yellow-grey submarginal area and a grey postdiscal area. The hindwings are grey with a narrow dark border.

References

Natural History Museum Lepidoptera generic names catalog

Cossinae
Moths described in 2007